Kinshasa Makambo is a documentary film from the Democratic Republic of the Congo, directed by Dieudo Hamadi and released in 2018. The film centres on three young Congolese democracy activists who were involved in the 2016 protests against president Joseph Kabila.

The film premiered on February 18, 2018, at the 68th Berlin International Film Festival. The film won the Tim Hetherington Award at the 2018 Sheffield DocFest, and the True Vision Award at the 2018 True/False Film Festival.

References

External links

2018 films
2018 documentary films
Democratic Republic of the Congo documentary films
French documentary films
German documentary films
Swiss documentary films
Qatari documentary films
Norwegian documentary films
Documentary films about the Democratic Republic of the Congo
2010s French films
2010s German films